This article details versions of MS-DOS, IBM PC DOS, and at least partially compatible disk operating systems. It does not include the many other operating systems called "DOS" which are unrelated to IBM PC compatibles.

Historical and licensing information 
Originally MS-DOS was designed to be an operating system that could run on any computer with a 8086-family microprocessor. It competed with other operating systems written for such computers, such as CP/M-86 and UCSD Pascal. Each computer would have its own distinct hardware and its own version of MS-DOS, a situation similar to the one that existed for CP/M, with MS-DOS emulating the same solution as CP/M to adapt for different hardware platforms. So there were many different original equipment manufacturer (OEM) versions of MS-DOS for different hardware. But the greater speed attainable by direct control of hardware was of particular importance, especially when running computer games. So very soon an IBM-compatible architecture became the goal, and before long all 8086-family computers closely emulated IBM hardware, and only a single version of MS-DOS for a fixed hardware platform was all that was needed for the market. This specific version of MS-DOS is the version that is discussed here, as all other versions of MS-DOS died out with their respective systems. One version of such a generic MS-DOS (Z-DOS) is mentioned here, but there were dozens more. All these were for personal computers that used an 8086-family microprocessor, but which were not fully IBM PC compatible.

Technical specifications

See also 
 Timeline of DOS operating systems
 List of operating systems
 Comparison of Linux distributions
 Comparison of operating systems

References

External links 
 Detailed timeline of DOS variants
 DR-DOS version dates

 Comparison of DOS
DOS